Fatal Charm (also known as The Fatal Charm from 1978–1979) is a post-punk turned alternative rock band that formed in Nottingham, England in 1978.

From 1980 onwards, their musical style contained variations on the alternative rock genre that defied comparison with other emerging UK acts such as Echo & the Bunnymen, the Cure, New Order and Ultravox, who were darker and more introspective. Neither were they as 'poppy' as the female fronted bands that followed, such as T'Pau, the Primitives, and the Darling Buds.

Early days
The band was formed in 1978 by Paul Arnall and quickly took on new members. Over the years, recording deals came and went, due mainly to a great deal of uncertainty and volatility that existed in the music industry at that time. By 1980, the line-up was:

Paul Arnall (guitar, vocals, songwriter)
David Barker (keyboards)
Kevin Davies (bass guitar)
Kevin Gallagher (drums)

The four-piece released four tracks on the 1980 compilation LP East. The collapse of various recording contracts precipitated frequent changes to the personnel, and vocalist Sarah Simmonds joined in the same year, enabling Arnall to concentrate on his writing and musicianship. On occasion, the band was even reduced to the Arnall/Simmonds duo, and they continued to perform live with the aid of reel-to-reel tapes and Simmonds playing keyboards.

The band supported big-name acts like Ultravox and Orchestral Manoeuvres in the Dark on tour, gaining them some media coverage, including an appearance on Channel 4's music television programme The Tube in 1983. They also played two Radio 1 In Concert shows, supporting Ultravox and the Cult.

Debut album

The third single, 1984's "Summer Spies" (previous singles "Paris" and "Christine" had not attracted much interest) was something of a turning point. The song's driving rhythm and occasional whispered vocals captured the imagination of UK indie music fans and despite low sales, proved to be a catalyst for 1985's debut album, Endangered Species. The singles "King of Comedy" and "You Know (You'll Never Believe)" were also released in the lead up to the album launch, but were poorly promoted. The album was however, well received and prompted more radio work.

Arnall and Simmonds followed up with the single "Images of Fire" in 1986, recorded on 8-track at home released by Native Records and it peaked at No. 16 in the UK Independent Singles Chart. The song gained the band many more fans. Likewise, 1987's single "Lucille", also released by Native, charted. This was a relief to the band, as previous recording attempts had failed due to record company problems. Around this time, Simmonds revealed interest in writing melodies and hook lines and the pair set about writing some more material. They also considered changing their name to 'The Love Brigade' and developing a more 'thrash' pop sound; however following a lack of interest from Native, the idea fell flat.

Second album
In 1989, the band's second album, This Strange Attraction was greeted by critical acclaim from most quarters and another radio session arranged for Radio 1's Bob Harris. This time the recording was on their own label - "Really Great Records".  Presumably the name paid homage to, or was a parody of, the East Midlands-based "Dead Good Records" later re-released on Native Records. Mansfield's B-Movie included 3 Fatal Charm tracks on the 1979 compilation album East.

By now there had been many Radio 1 sessions for some of the station's DJs, including Janice Long, Andy Peebles, Annie Nightingale and Simon Mayo.

In the wake of the second album, there was considerable media interest in the band and they were offered financial backing, a new management deal and (eventually) a contract with major label RCA Records. Consequently, the Fatal Charm name was shelved in recognition of a new beginning based on a more ambient dance/pop style of music. State of Grace was born in 1991 and ran through to 1998.

Retrospective works and live performances
In 1996, a retrospective collection of the band's earliest material was released (titled Out of my Head, by the Fatal Charm).

Then in 2005, Arnall returned to the original tapes of various archived recordings, some of them previously unreleased and others unfinished. The keyboards and synthesizers were stripped back and replaced with a cleaner, more contemporary guitar sound. The third Fatal Charm album is simply entitled Pop and includes a re-worked version of "Western Laughter", previously only available as a flexi-disc given away free at early concerts.

Pop, published by the band's own Cycles and Trips label is only available through the website and appears therefore to be a side-project rather than an attempt to re-launch the band in a full-time capacity.

Simmonds has over the years obtained qualifications in music, trained her voice to cover a range of singing styles, become a singing teacher and has sung with internationally acclaimed vocal groups The Swingle Singers (1st alto) and Synergy. Her other credits include contributions to the soundtracks for Troy, Star Wars: Episode III – Revenge of the Sith and Shrek 2; also backing vocals for Björk at the opening ceremony of the 2004 Summer Olympics.

Pop was followed by the release of further retrospective albums featuring the various incarnations of the band. After a lengthy period of inactivity, Fatal Charm performed live dates in March and April 2012 and added more dates throughout the year.

Discography

Albums
as Fatal Charm
Endangered Species (1985), Carrere
This Strange Attraction (1989), Really Great
Out of My Head (1996), Three Lines
Pop (2005), Really Great
Lovebrigade (2006), Really Great

as State of Grace
Pacific Motion (1994), 3rd Stone
Jamboreebop (1995), 3rd Stone
Every Day (1997)
Everyone Else's Universe (1997), 3rd Stone
Sometimes (1998), Zimbabel
Sometimes - More (1999) - Zimbabel
Ocean (2007), Zimbabel

Compilations
Plastic (2006), Really Great

Singles
as Fatal Charm
"Paris" (1979), Company
"Western Laughter"/"Dark Eyes" (1980), Double D
"Paris"/"Christine" (1981), Ariola
"Summer Spies" (1984), Carrere
"You Know (You'll Never Believe)" (1985), Carrere
"King of Comedy" (1985), Carrere
"Images of Fire" (1986), Native - UK Indie No. 25
"Lucille" (1987), Native

as State of Grace
"Camden" (1992), Cheree
"Love, Pain & Passion" (1992), 3rd Stone
Free Thoughts EP (1992), Cheree - split with The Bardots and Barenaked Ladies
"Miss You" (1993), 3rd Stone
"Smile" (1995), 3rd Stone
Hello EP (1995), RCA

References

External links
 Official Fatal Charm Website, with Audio, Discography, History
 
 Fan site, Biography, Partial Discography
 Sarah Simmonds Website with Audio

Musical groups established in 1978
English rock music groups
English post-punk music groups
British indie rock groups
English new wave musical groups
Musical groups from Nottingham